Legislative Assembly elections were held in Haryana on 11 March 1972 to elect all 81 members of the Haryana Legislative Assembly.

Results

Elected members

See also 
 1972 elections in India
 Elections in Haryana

References 

Haryana
State Assembly elections in Haryana